Badminton Korea Association (BKA, 대한배드민턴협회; Daehan baedeuminteon hyeobhoe) is the national governing body for the sport of badminton in South Korea.

History
Badminton was spread in Korea after Liberation Day and was not organized until the establishment of Badminton Korea Association in 1957. It later become an official sport in Korean National Sports Festival since 1962.  In 2019, Yonex replaced Victor as Badminton Korea equipment partner for Badminton Korea Association.

Presidents
List of presidents that have served in the organization since 1957.

Tournaments
 Korea Open, an annual open tournament that attracts the world's elite players and currently part of BWF World Tour.
 Korea Masters, annual tournament held since 2007.

 Korea DB badminton league

References

National members of the Badminton World Federation
Badminton in South Korea
Badminton
1957 establishments in South Korea